Sulby is a village in the parish of Kirk Christ Lezayre that is located on the A3 Castletown to Ramsey in the Isle of Man.

Location
Historically containing the Treen of the Curragh of Kirk Christ Lezayre and the Land of the Monks of Myrosco, the village is situated at the southern edge of the island's northern alluvial plain; north of the island's northern hills; at the point where the Sulby River emerges from those hills.

The old part of Sulby is situated at the junction between the A14 Tholt-y-Will Road and the B9 Claddagh Road. This part of Sulby has a mill and a village green. The main part of the village is situated along the main A3 road between Close-e-Volley and Ginger Hall, centred on its junction with the A14. In this area there is a church, a post office, general stores, and an inn. Sulby has a primary school, a hotel and a large campsite in the river meadow of Sulby Claddagh. The village is dominated by the Sulby River, the Ballamanaugh farm estate, common land of the Claddagh and Cronk (hill) Sumark, which includes the remains of a fort from the Iron Age.

Name
The name Sulby ('Soli's farm')), or Súla  + bý  (cleft or fork) in the Sulby river) reflects the Scandinavian influence in Isle of Man place-names.

Motor-Sport heritage
Sulby village located on the A3 road including  the   Sulby Straight  and Sulby Bridge was part of the 37.50 Mile Four Inch Course  for the RAC Tourist Trophy automobile races held in the Isle of Man between 1908 and 1922.

In 1911, the Four Inch Course for automobiles was first used by the Auto-Cycling Union for the Isle of Man TT motor-cycle races. This included the Sulby Straight. The course later became known as the 37.73 mile Isle of Man TT Course which has been used since 1911 for the Isle of Man TT Races and from 1923 for the Manx Grand Prix races.

This speed value was registered by the on-board data-logging equipment. This unofficial speed record of was achieved again in 2015 by the TT competitor James Hillier riding the Kawasaki H2R factory concept bike during a demonstration lap, recorded by onboard Strava data-logging equipment.

Sulby Bridge
The notorious hump-backed Sulby Bridge on the A3 road located at the eastern end of the Sulby Straight (built c.1815), considered at the time to be the most difficult part of the TT Course for motor-cycle competitors, was removed in 1922–23 by the Isle of Man Highway Board and the road widened and road profile improved.

The Sulby Bridge was originally built in 1739 as a result of the 1739 Bridges Act to improve access to roads in the Isle of Man. The nearby ‘Five Ton Bridge’ over the Sulby river was built in 1935 on the Sulby Claddagh to replace a ford and footbridge damaged in flooding in September 1930.

Sulby railway stations
The village of Sulby was previously served by the Sulby Glen and Sulby Bridge railway stations until the Ramsey to St. Johns line closed in 1968.

Produce
ManX Spirit is a clear alcoholic beverage that is distilled from whisky by Kella Distillers Ltd in Sulby.

Gallery

See also

Sulby Bridge railway station
Sulby Glen railway station
Sulby Reservoir

References

Villages in the Isle of Man
Roads in the Isle of Man